Hugh V. "Hugo" Maiocco (April 5, 1927 – August 9, 2017) was an American sprinter who competed in the 1951 Pan American Games. He was a member of the American relay team which won the gold medal in the 4×400 metres event. He won the silver medal in the 400 metre competition and the bronze medal in the 800 metre competition.

References

1927 births
2017 deaths
American male sprinters
Place of birth missing
Athletes (track and field) at the 1951 Pan American Games
Pan American Games medalists in athletics (track and field)
Pan American Games gold medalists for the United States
Pan American Games silver medalists for the United States
Pan American Games bronze medalists for the United States
Medalists at the 1951 Pan American Games